Mikhail Kukushkin was the defending champion but chose to compete in the 2014 Aegon Championships instead.

Frank Dancevic won the title, defeating Norbert Gombos in the final, 6–2, 3–6, 6–2.

Seeds

  Andreas Haider-Maurer (second round)
  Facundo Argüello (quarterfinals)
  Adrian Ungur (second round)
  Damir Džumhur (first round)
  Gerald Melzer (second round)
  Andrej Martin (second round)
  Norbert Gombos (final)
  Wayne Odesnik (first round)

Draw

Finals

Top half

Bottom half

References
 Main Draw
 Qualifying Draw

Kosice Openandnbsp;- Singles
2014 Singles